Darren Eales (born 6 August 1972) is an English sports executive who currently serves as Chief Executive Officer of Premier League club Newcastle United.

He was previously a footballer who played both collegiately and professionally in the United States. He was a 1995 first team All American and earned his Cambridge Blue in 1998. In July 2010, he was appointed director of football administration at Tottenham Hotspur. In 2014 he became Chief Executive Officer of Atlanta United in the MLS.

Early life
Eales grew up in Cambridge, England. As he approached the end of his secondary education, he was faced with the decision of attending university or pursuing a football career. When approached by an American university scout offering him the opportunity to both play and attend university, he decided to move to the United States.

Education and college football
Eales attended Brown University, a member of the Ivy League, playing on the school's NCAA Division I soccer team from 1991 to 1994. In his final season, he was the Ivy League Player of the Year and a first team All American. He received a first class bachelor's degree in economics.

Playing career

U.S. football
In 1995, Eales signed with the Hampton Roads Mariners of the USISL. He spent two seasons with the Mariners, scoring 24 goals in 19 games in 1995. In 1997, he played five games for the Hershey Wildcats.

English football
Eales continued to play at the amateur level. In 2001, he joined the Newmarket Town Reserves in the Kershaw League. He later moved to the Lancashire County Football Association where he played for Millhead Reserves from 2004 to 2006 and Higher Poynton from 2006 to 2007.

Professional career
In 1997, Eales returned to England, where he read law at Cambridge, and gained his Cambridge Blue in 1998. He became a member of the bar in 2000 and eventually joined 2 Temple Gardens. On 6 May 2006, he was hired as an in-house legal counsel by West Brom. and was subsequently made a Director and Company Secretary.

On 2 March 2010, Spurs announced that Eales was joining them as club secretary at the end of that season. On 1 July 2010, he officially joined the club as Director of Football Administration.

On 10 September 2014, Eales was named the president of the new Atlanta MLS expansion club, Atlanta United FC.

On 15 July 2022, Eales became the CEO of Newcastle United FC.

References

1971 births
Living people
English footballers
English solicitors
Brown Bears men's soccer players
Virginia Beach Mariners players
Hershey Wildcats players
USISL players
Newmarket Town F.C. players
All-American men's college soccer players
Association football forwards
English expatriate sportspeople in the United States
Expatriate soccer players in the United States
English expatriate footballers
English sports executives and administrators